Kleinniedesheim is a municipality in the Rhein-Pfalz-Kreis, in Rhineland-Palatinate, Germany.

Politics

Municipal Council

Mayor 
The mayor of Kleinniedesheim is Ewald Merkel (FWG).

References

Rhein-Pfalz-Kreis